Synnøve Solemdal (born 15 May 1989) is a Norwegian former biathlete.

Career
Solemdal won two bronze medals at the 2010 Junior World Championships. As of the 2010/2011 season she is part of the Norwegian team. On 11 December 2010, she along with her teammates placed third in 4 × 6 km relay in Hochfilzen.

She took her first world cup victory in the 2012–13 season, moving up from 4th after the Sprint race to take the Pursuit in Hochfilzen. She repeated the feat the following year to claim her second victory, also in the pursuit in Hochfilzen during the 2013–14 season.

At the 2012 World Championships in Ruhpolding she won a gold medal in mix relay and a bronze medal in relay.  She won a gold medal in the mixed relay at the 2013 Biathlon World Championships in the Czech Republic.

Biathlon results
All results are sourced from the International Biathlon Union.

Olympic Games
0 medals

*The mixed relay was added as an event in 2014.

World Championships
6 medals (5 gold, 1 bronze)

*During Olympic seasons competitions are only held for those events not included in the Olympic program.
**The single mixed relay was added as an event in 2019.

References

External links
 
 
 
 
 

1989 births
Living people
Sportspeople from Møre og Romsdal
Norwegian female biathletes
Biathlon World Championships medalists
Biathletes at the 2014 Winter Olympics
Biathletes at the 2018 Winter Olympics
Olympic biathletes of Norway
21st-century Norwegian women